Nga Yamankan (1039–1084) was Governor of Pegu (Bago) from 1077 to 1084, who raised an unsuccessful rebellion against Saw Lu of Pagan Dynasty. He nearly succeeded. He captured and killed Lu. But he was driven out of Upper Burma by Lu's half-brother, Kyansittha and was killed while in retreat.

Early life
Yamankan, an ethnic Mon, was raised in Pagan at the court of King Anawrahta. His mother, who was of noble birth, was Anawrahta's son Lu's wet nurse.  his posthumous name Yamankan.

He and Lu grew up together at the Pagan court, and became close friends. When Lu became in king in 1077, he appointed his childhood friend governor of Pegu. Lu proved an ineffective ruler, and over time, Yamankan became convinced that he could successfully break away. He wanted independence for his Mon homeland, which was conquered by Anawrahta only in 1057.

In 1084, Yamankan had a fallout with Lu, and raised a rebellion. He sailed up the Irrawaddy river with his army, and took a position on an island a few miles below Pagan. Lu recalled Kyansittha from exile, and gave him the command of Pagan army. They marched south and halted near Myingun (near Magwe). Yamankan's army was stationed at Thayet. Lu was impatient and against Kyansittha's warning, attacked. But Yamankan had expected such an attack and prepared his positions well. Lu's army was routed and the king was taken prisoner.

Yamankan executed Lu after Kyansittha tried to rescue Lu. (Ironically, the rescue attempt was foiled by Lu who alerted the guards that he was being rescued. The captive king trusted his childhood friend and captor Yamankan more than his brother Kyansittha.)  Yamankan himself was ambushed by the sniper bow-shot of Nga Sin the hunter and died.

Governorship
Although the royal chronicles say he was governor of Pegu, the earliest evidence of Pegu as a place dates only to 1266, about two centuries later than when Yamankan was supposed to have been governor. Furthermore, at least one 18th century Mon language chronicle says the first governor of Pegu in the Pagan period was appointed only in 1273/74.

Notes

References

Bibliography
 
 
 
 
 
 

Pagan dynasty
1084 deaths
Burmese people of Mon descent
Year of birth unknown
11th-century Burmese people